Fountain Plaza Apartments is a historic apartment building at 830-856 Hinman Avenue in Evanston, Illinois. The three-story brick building was built in 1922. Swedish-born architect John A. Nyden, who also designed multiple other apartment buildings in Evanston, designed the building in the Classical Revival style. The building's design includes Palladian doors with fanlights, limestone quoins, and a hip roof with parapets and a cornice. The central courtyard is both raised and nearly surrounded by the building, providing privacy despite the building's proximity to a commercial district.

The building was added to the National Register of Historic Places on March 15, 1984.

References

Buildings and structures on the National Register of Historic Places in Cook County, Illinois
Residential buildings on the National Register of Historic Places in Illinois
Buildings and structures in Evanston, Illinois
Residential buildings completed in 1922
Neoclassical architecture in Illinois
Apartment buildings in Illinois